Reginald Alberto Agrati Stoneham (1879 – 11 March 1942) was an Australian composer and publisher of mostly topical songs, and a musical comedy F.F.F. He was perhaps Australia's leading exponent of jazz and ragtime piano styles in the first decades of the 20th century as both composer and performer. He was also a popular accompanist and recording artist.

Biography
He was born in Carlton, Victoria in 1879, the fifth son of musician William (c. 1833 – 25 March 1913) and Ellen Stoneham (c. 1846 – 10 February 1889) of 210 Madeline Street Carlton. 
 
In 1900 he served in the South Australian Mounted Rifles as a private trumpeter. His trade was listed as "wood turner". He was wounded in action at Slobet's Nek.

In 1901 he married Adelaide Minnie "Addie" Lyons (1880–1959). They had a daughter Val Augusta Elsa Stoneham on 10 April 1902. Described as "one of Melbourne's leading florists", she was employed by Harris, Scarfe, Ltd., Adelaide in 1933.

Stoneham is most remembered for the song "Sleepy Seas" and patriotic songs during World War 1, notably the popular "Heroes of the Dardanelles".

He lived at St Kilda, Victoria from 1918. In 1920 he composed the musical comedy, F.F.F., styled as a "mystery musical comedy", with a book and lyrics by C. J. De Garis, was underwritten by Hugh D. McIntosh. It starred Maggie Moore and Charles H. Workman, among others. The "mystery" centred on the meaning of the enigmatic title, for which solutions were solicited and a prize offered. The show played at Adelaide's Prince of Wales Theatre for a successful season, followed by a week in Perth and a fortnight in Melbourne, where the "Argus" critic praised the songs but lambasted the play. It has not been revived.

In November 1929 the baritone Robert Nicholson recorded "Ballarat the Fair" and "Back to Warrnambool", accompanied by Stoneham. In March 1930 he recorded "Mildura (Home of Mine)".

In 1932 he conducted a radio orchestra in Adelaide.

Ill and unemployed, with an invalid wife and daughter to support, he petitioned for bankruptcy in 1936.

He was buried with the ritual of the Returned Services League

Other compositions
All for Australia 
Albury for The Weekly Times newspaper 1932
The Attack (on Zeebrugge) 
Back Home 
Back to Warrnambool 
The Bells of Peace 
Bendigo for The Weekly Times newspaper 1932
Come to Mildura – the Land of Winter Sunshine
Coral Isles c. 1923 
Distant Memories Waltz 1914 
The Drover 1912 
(Those) Foolish Wives 1922 
Football Song and Chorus Commissioned by West Adelaide Football Club 1911
For God and St George, 1914  used as a recruiting song during World War I
Frivolina c. 1916 
Garden of Rosy Dreams  featured in Hugh D. McIntosh's revue "Bubbly"
Golden Dreams 1924 
Heroes of the Dardanelles 1915  recording by Peter Dawson and John Ralston 
Home Fireside 
 Home to Ballaarat 
Jazzin' the Blues 
King of the Air 1913   as recorded by Malcolm McEachern 
Lolita 1928  recorded by Jack Lumsdaine
Love  featured in Hugh D. McIntosh's revue "Bubbly"
Maryborough for The Weekly Times newspaper 1932
Mellow Mersey Moon for "Come to Tasmania" carnival 1927 
Memories of a Lovely Lei (with Barronne Kuva) 
Mildura (Home of Mine)
The Murray Moon c.1922 with C.J. De Garis 
Peace and Glory 
Pride of the Nation: The National March of Australia 
Princess Betty's Lullaby 1927  for Princess Elizabeth, later Queen Elizabeth II
(My) Ragtime Drummer Boy 
A Road To Anywhere "Between 1920 and 1932" 
Sleepy Seas
Sun-Raysed Waltz  for Australian Dried Fruits Association of Mildura, Victoria.
The Tango Rag 1914 
Tantalising Eyes  featured in Hugh D. McIntosh's revue "Lads of the Village"
The Tintex Girl 1924 
That Was a Perfect Night 
The Wabash Moon c. 1922 
Waikiki Moon  
The Warrnambool Waltz Song 
When the Wattles Bloom Again (with Dan Leahy) 
 What'll we do when the wattle blooms again?
Commerce and Heart a radio play
as "Alberto Agrati"
The Hesitation Valse-tango 1914 
I've Got a Motorbike (waiting for you) 
Viceroy Tea Waltz

Critical reception
Reginald Stoneham is mentioned in Australian newspapers as a well known and respected music creator.

His work 'For God and St George' featured in a charity concert to support Belgians at the outbreak of the Great War.

Further reading
Van Straten, Frank Play it Again Reg in Theatre Heritage Australia: on stage  part 1. in Vol.11 no.3 WINTER 2010 p. 10; part 2 in Vol.11 no.4 SPRING 2010 p. 42
Van Straten, Frank. The Riddle of 'FFF', A Forgotten Australian Musical Comedy Australasian Music Research, No. 6, 2002: 105–119. Availability: http://search.informit.com.au/documentSummary;dn=755888837969038;res=IELHSS 
Hill, Jennifer, "Stoneham, Reg(inald) A. A.)", in Oxford Companion to Australian Music (ed. Warren Bebbington) (Melbourne: OUP, 1997), p. 532

External links 
 His copyright stamp
 Access online audio recordings at National Film and Sound Archive of Australia 
 Australian Variety Theatre Archive

References 

1879 births
1942 deaths
Australian male composers
Australian songwriters
Composers
Jazz
Australian musical theatre composers
Australian jazz trumpeters
Australian accompanists
Male jazz musicians
People from Carlton, Victoria
Musicians from Melbourne
Australian accordionists